Bure is a Swedish surname that may refer to

 A personal name preservad in Burestenen, a Swedish runestone
 A Swedish family name, see Bure kinship
 Johannes Bureus or Johan Bure, a Swedish 17th century polymath
Candace Cameron Bure (born 1976), American actress, producer, author and talk show panelist
Pavel Bure (born 1971), Russian hockey player
Valeri Bure (born 1974), Russian hockey player, brother of Pavel
Vladimir Bure (born 1950), Soviet swimmer, father of Pavel and Valeri Bure

Swedish-language surnames